S. Machendranathan IAS, who hails from Tirunelveli District, Tamil Nadu had a distinguished academic career. After completing MBA from Cochin University he joined the Indian Police Service (IPS) in 1977 and thereafter the Indian Administrative Service (IAS) in 1979.

An IAS officer of the Tamil Nadu cadre, Shri S. Machendranathan held several important positions in the Government of Tamil Nadu and in the Central Government of India.

In the Government of Tamil Nadu, he worked as Collector of Thanjavur District; Commissioner/Secretary to the Government of Tamil Nadu in the Departments of Transport, Food, Cooperation and Consumer Protection; Chairman of Tamil Nadu Electricity Board.

In the Government of India, he worked as Chairman of VOC Port Trust, Tuticorin; Additional Secretary & Financial Advisor in the Ministry of Steel as well as in the Ministry of Civil Aviation and finally as Secretary (Coordination) in Cabinet Secretariat, before superannuating from the Government Service in March, 2014.

He has also served as Government Director in several Public Sector companies such as Air India, Airports Authority of India, Steel Authority of India Limited, Rashtriya Ispat Nigam Limited, Kudremukh Iron Ore Company Limited and Metallurgical & Engineering Consultants (India) Limited.

Executive Profile

References

External links 
 Business Standard
Millennium Post
Malaimalar
The First Mail

1954 births
Living people
District magistrate